Khol-Kilyazi is a village in the Khizi Rayon of Azerbaijan.

References 

Populated places in Khizi District